The 7th congressional district of South Carolina is a congressional district for the United States House of Representatives in South Carolina, established in 2011 following apportionment of another seat to the state in the redistricting cycle following the 2010 census. It is located in the Pee Dee region, and includes all of Chesterfield, Darlington, Dillon, Georgetown, Horry, Marion, and Marlboro Counties and parts of Florence County. The district is represented by Russell Fry who was elected in 2022 and took office on January 3, 2023.

History
The 7th congressional district of South Carolina existed in the 19th century, but was eliminated in 1853 as a result of the 1850 census. After the 1880 census, Congress apportioned the state another seat, and the state legislature re-established the district.

By that time, the Reconstruction era had ended and the state legislature was controlled by Democrats, who wrested control by a mixture of violence and fraud. They defined the boundaries of the 7th district, which was called the "shoestring district" because of its long, narrow shape that included many black precincts. In 1892 and 1894 the majority-black voters of the district elected George W. Murray to Congress; he was the only African American to serve in Congress in those sessions and, following disfranchisement and demographic changes, the last elected from the state until Jim Clyburn in 1992.

In 1895, the Democrat-dominated state legislature passed a new constitution, disfranchising black voters by changes to voter registration and electoral rules that were applied against them in a discriminatory way. For decades after 1896, only white Democrats were elected to Congress from the state. (Such disfranchisement occurred among all the states of the former Confederacy, and their use of poll taxes, literacy tests, grandfather clauses, and white primaries survived several US Supreme Court challenges.)

During the first half of the 20th century, 6.5 million blacks in total left South Carolina and other southern states in the Great Migration to the North, Midwest and West. Following cumulative declines in state population, after the 1930 census, South Carolina lost a seat and the 7th district was eliminated in redistricting. It was last represented by Democrat Hampton P. Fulmer, who was redistricted into the 2nd district.

South Carolina had only six districts for the next 80 years. African Americans were effectively barred from voting until after passage of the Voting Rights Act of 1965. Increases in population led to the state's receiving another congressional seat in the redistricting cycle following the 2010 census.

The 7th district is located in the rapidly developing area of northeastern South Carolina, including the Myrtle Beach metropolitan area (the Grand Strand) and the Pee Dee region. It is a white-majority district and its voters elected Republican Tom Rice as US Representative from the district in 2012; he took office in January 2013, when the 113th Congress convened. Due almost entirely to the presence of heavily Republican Horry County, which has as many people as the rest of the district combined, it tilts Republican.

The district boundaries are roughly similar to the configuration of the 6th congressional district before it was reconfigured after the 1990 census as a black-majority district.

Counties 
Counties in the 2023-2033 district map.
 Chesterfield County
 Darlington County
 Dillon County
 Florence County (part)
 Georgetown County
 Horry County
 Marion County
 Marlboro County

Election results from presidential races

List of members representing the district

Recent election results

2012

2014

2016

2018

2020

2022

See also 

 South Carolina's congressional districts
 List of United States congressional districts

References

 Congressional Biographical Directory of the United States 1774–present

07
Constituencies established in 2013
2013 establishments in South Carolina